Leslie "Les" Anthony (21 November 1921 – 24 October 2010) was a Welsh rugby union, and professional rugby league footballer who played in the 1940s and 1950s. He played representative level rugby union (RU) for Wales, and at club level for Cwmllynfell RFC and Neath RFC (captain), as a prop, i.e. number 1 or 3, and club level rugby league (RL) for Oldham (Heritage № 530).

Background
Les Anthony was born in Rhiwfawr, Wales. he was worked as a collier and sheet metal worker, and he died aged 88. Up to his death, he had been the third oldest living Wales player, behind; Jack Matthews and Handel Greville, and the oldest living Wales forward, in front of; Emlyn Davies.

Playing career

International honours
Les Anthony won caps for Wales (RU) while at Neath RFC in 1938 against England, Scotland, and France.

Notable tour matches
Les Anthony played prop, alongside hooker; Cliff Williams and prop; Les Davies, in Neath RFC's 15-22 defeat by the New Zealand Army Touring XV ("The Kiwis") at The Gnoll, Neath during 1945.

Club career

Neath RFC
Les Anthony played in Neath RFC's victory in the Welsh Club Championship during the 1946–47 season, captained by Cliff Williams, this was Neath RFC's first post-World War II victory, and their sixth of ten overall.

Oldham RLFC
He made his début for Oldham on Saturday 28 August 1948, and he played his last match for Oldham during the 1953–54 season.

References

External links
Search for "Anthony" at rugbyleagueproject.org
Statistics at orl-heritagetrust.org.uk
 (archived by archive.is) Les Anthony's obituary at neathrugby.co.uk
Search for "Leslie Anthony" at britishnewspaperarchive.co.uk
Search for "Les Anthony" at britishnewspaperarchive.co.uk

1921 births
2010 deaths
Footballers who switched code
Neath RFC players
Oldham R.L.F.C. players
Rugby league players from Neath Port Talbot
Rugby union players from Neath Port Talbot
Rugby union props
Wales international rugby union players
Welsh rugby league players
Welsh rugby union players